On 12 July 1992, a total of 69 Bosnian Serb soldiers and civilians were killed in the villages of Zalužje and Sase in the municipality of Srebrenica, and Biljača and Zagoni in the municipality of Bratunac, after an attack by the Army of the Republic of Bosnia and Herzegovina (ARBiH). It occurred during the Bosnian War.

Background
At the beginning of the Bosnian war, the Army of Republika Srpska (VRS) attacked majority Bosniak cities and villages in eastern Bosnia, conducting ethnic cleansing operations with the goal of forming an adjacent Serb-controlled land bordering Serbia. After the Siege of Srebrenica, between April 1992 and March 1993, the Srebrenica area was regularly subjected to Serb military assaults, including artillery attacks, sniper fire, as well as occasional bombing from aircraft. From June 1992 to March 1993, Bosnian Muslims raided Bosnian Serb villages, partly in order to acquire food and military armaments.

Incident
On the Serbian Eastern Orthodox holy feast of Petrovdan on 12 July 1992, Bosniak forces, allegedly under the command of Naser Orić, attacked the villages of Zalužje and Sase in the municipality of Srebrenica and Biljača and Zagoni in the municipality of Bratunac, killing a total of 69 Bosnian Serb soldiers and civilians. At least 40 of those killed were from locals from Zalužje.

Apart from the killed, there were also 22 Serbs who were reported as missing. The bodies of ten of them were found in a mass grave in June 2011 during a search for Bosniak victims above the settlement of Vidikovac. After their remains were identified, they were buried at the Zalužje cemetery.

Aftermath
In 2006, Orić was sentenced to two years imprisonment by the ICTY for not preventing the mistreatment and deaths of Serb detainees. In 2008, the tribunal reversed the conviction and also acquitted him of crimes against Serbs committed in Srebrenica from 1992 to 1993. A re-trial in Bosnia and Herzegovina resulted in acquittal in 2018 on charges of killings of three Serb prisoners in the towns of Zalazje, Lolići and Kunjerac. However, the killings of Serbs in Zalužje, Sase, Biljača and Zagoni on 12 July 1992 were not part of any of the charges brought against Orić. Local officials along with the families of the victims have expressed their concerns over the lack of accountability and justice for perpetrators who committed the killings.

Commemoration and legacy
Commemorations for the victims are held each year in the village of Zalužje where a memorial has been erected, alongside one for Serbian victims of the village during World War II. It is part of an annual series of public events organized by the government of Republika Srpska and veterans groups around Petrovdan, culminating in a ceremony at the military cemetery in Bratunac for Serb victims who perished in areas near Srebrenica during the war. Analysts have observed how this commemoration is held parallel to the Bosniak commemorations for the victims of the Srebrenica massacre in Potočari as a form of competing victimhood and narratives about the war.

References

Sources

News

Books

ICTY

Further reading

External links
 

Massacres in the Bosnian War
Massacres of Serbs
Bosniak war crimes in the Bosnian War
July 1992 events in Europe
1992 in Bosnia and Herzegovina
Mass murder in 1992
Srebrenica
Bratunac